Matthew Howard III (born 1959) is an American neurosurgeon, electrophysiologist, and inventor. He is currently a Professor and Chairman of the Department of Neurosurgery at the University of Iowa. He is well known for his contributions in the field of human brain mapping using intracranial electrophysiology.

References

American neurosurgeons
1959 births
Living people